Hiawanda's Cross is a 1913 silent short drama film directed and written by Romaine Fielding with scenario by Jeanette Spiess. Mary Ryan returns as costar. It was produced by the Lubin Manufacturing Company and distributed through the General Film Company.

It was filmed in Las Vegas, New Mexico.

Cast
Romaine Fielding - The Missionary
Mary Ryan - Hiawanda
Jeanette Spiess -
Rose Powers -
Chella Van Petten - 
Ethel Danziger -
Carl Ilfeld - Gray Eagle
Hans Lewis -

References

External links
 Hiawanda's Cross at IMDb.com

1913 films
American silent short films
1913 short films
American black-and-white films
Films directed by Romaine Fielding
Lubin Manufacturing Company films
Silent American drama films
1913 drama films
1910s American films